The Jamaica Open is a golf tournament held in Jamaica. Founded in 1953, it was held annually until 1995 when lack of sponsorship lead to a ten-year hiatus. The tournament returned in 2006, and then 2008 to 2012. After another brief interlude, the 50th Jamaica Open was held in 2017 and it has continued to be staged annually since then.

Between 1958 and 1963, the Jamaica Open was a fixture on the PGA-sponsored Caribbean Tour, at which time it was frequented by many of the leading American professionals. Having withdrawn from the Caribbean Tour, the event became a much smaller local affair.

Winners

References

Golf tournaments in Jamaica
Recurring sporting events established in 1953